"It's My Life" is a song written by Alexander Bard, Bobby Ljunggren and Oscar Holter, and performed by Amy Diamond at Melodifestivalen 2009. The song was part of the second semifinal inside the Skellefteå Kraft Arena on 14 February 2009, and headed directly for Andra chansen, where the song was knocked out.

The single peaked number 14 on the Swedish singles chart.

Charts

References

External links
Information at Svensk mediedatabas

2009 singles
2009 songs
Amy Deasismont songs
Melodifestivalen songs of 2009
Songs written by Alexander Bard
Songs written by Bobby Ljunggren
Bonnier Music singles
English-language Swedish songs
Songs written by Oscar Holter